This is a complete list of members of the United States House of Representatives during the 116th United States Congress, which runs from January 3, 2019, through January 3, 2021, ordered by seniority.

Seniority list

Delegates

See also
 List of members of the United States House of Representatives
 List of U.S. congressional districts
 List of United States Senators in the 116th Congress by seniority
 Seniority in the United States House of Representatives

References

External links
 

Seniority
116